Tshwete is a surname of South African origin. Notable people with the surname include:
Busisiwe Tshwete (born 1981), South African politician
Pam Tshwete (born 1961), South African politician
Steve Tshwete (1938–2002), South African politician and activist 

Xhosa-language surnames
Surnames of South African origin